Sphaerolobium minus, commonly known as globe-pea, is a species of flowering plant in the family Fabaceae and is endemic to south-eastern Australia. It is an erect, rush-like, mostly leafless shrub with yellow and reddish flowers arranged in small groups along the stems.

Description
Flowering occurs from September to December and the fruit is an inflated, spherical pod  in diameter.

Taxonomy and naming
Sphaerolobium minus was first formally described in 1805 by Jacques Labillardière in hisNovae Hollandiae Plantarum Specimen. The specific epithet (minus) means "smaller".

Distribution and habitat
Globe-pea usually grows in wet heath, sometimes in the understorey of forest and is widely distributed along the coast and nearby ranges of south-east Queensland, eastern New South Wales, higher rainfall parts of southern Victoria, west to the Eyre Peninsula in South Australia and south to Tasmania.

References

minus
Eudicots of Western Australia
Plants described in 1805
Taxa named by Jacques Labillardière